Blainroe Golf Club is a golf course situated about 3.5 km south of  Wicklow Town in County Wicklow, Ireland. The course was originally built as part of a village resort in Blainroe by Dublin builder Christy Cooney.

As of 2020, Blainroe is ranked 95 in the Irish Golf Digest's Top 100 Courses in Ireland.

References

External links
Blainroe Golf Club

Golf clubs and courses in the Republic of Ireland
Golf in Leinster
Sports clubs in County Wicklow